Atle Knudsen (born 1971) is a Norwegian film and television director and screenwriter. He received the Gullruten in 2012 in the Best Children's or Youth Program category, for Vaffelhjarte.

Knudsen was married to journalist and writer Vera Micaelsen with whom he has three daughters. He is also the brother of footballers Jon and Mari Knudsen.

Filmography
 Bloodride (2020)
 Kampen for tilværelsen (season 2, episode 6, 7 and 8) (2014)
 MK-X (2014) (season 2, episode 2, 7 and 8)
 Trio - Odins Gull (2013)
 Hjem (episode 3, 4, 7 and 8) (2012)
 Vaffelhjarte (2011)
 ORPS (2009)
 ORPS – The Movie (2009)
 Jul i Svingen (2006)
 Linus i Svingen (2004) 
 Uhu! (2002)

References

External links

1971 births
Living people
Norwegian television directors
Norwegian film directors
Norwegian screenwriters